Cape Henlopen Archeological District is a national historic district located near Lewes, Sussex County, Delaware.  The district includes seven contributing sites.  They are a discontinuous series of discrete shell middens of varying sizes and cultural affiliation. They date from approximately 500 B.C. to 1600 A.D.

It was added to the National Register of Historic Places in 1978.

References

Archaeological sites on the National Register of Historic Places in Delaware
Historic districts on the National Register of Historic Places in Delaware
Historic districts in Sussex County, Delaware
Lewes, Delaware
National Register of Historic Places in Sussex County, Delaware